Jack Kramer (born John Francis Kramer; July 26, 1919 in Milwaukee, Wisconsin) was a professional American football player.

Career
Kramer played with the Buffalo Bisons of the All-America Football Conference in 1946. Previously, he had been drafted in the twentieth round of the 1945 NFL Draft by the Chicago Cardinals.

He played at the college level at Marquette University.

References

Players of American football from Milwaukee
Buffalo Bisons (AAFC) players
Marquette Golden Avalanche football players
1919 births
Year of death missing